The 2012 Aspria Tennis Cup Trofeo City Life was a professional tennis tournament played on outdoor red clay courts. It was the seventh edition of the tournament and was part of the 2012 ATP Challenger Tour. It took place in Milan, Italy between 25 June and 1 July 2012.

ATP entrants

Seeds

 Rankings are as of June 18, 2012.

Other entrants
The following players received wildcards into the singles main draw:
  Andrea Arnaboldi
  Frederico Gil
  Victor Hănescu
  Tommy Robredo

The following players received entry from the qualifying draw:
  Benjamin Balleret
  Nicolas Devilder
  Marek Michalička
  Walter Trusendi

Champions

Singles

 Tommy Robredo def.  Martín Alund 6-3 6-0

Doubles

 Nicholas Monroe /  Simon Stadler def.  Andrey Golubev /  Yuri Schukin, 6–4, 3–6, [11–9]

External links

Official website

Aspria Tennis Cup Trofeo City Life
Aspria Tennis Cup